Whiskey Falls is the only studio album by American country music group Whiskey Falls. It was released on September 25, 2007, on Midas Records. The album includes the singles "Last Train Running" and "Falling into You", which reached #32 and #40 respectively on the Billboard Hot Country Songs charts. "The Baseball Song" also peaked at #55 based on unsolicited airplay shortly before the release of "Falling into You". The album debuted at #171 on the US Billboard 200, and at #25 on the US Top Country Albums.

In 2010, Damon Johnson recorded his own version of "Better Days Will Come at Last" for his album Release. This version was a duet featuring Johnson and his daughter, Sarah Marlo Johnson.

Track listing

Charts

References

2007 debut albums
Whiskey Falls albums
Midas Records Nashville albums